800 Kressmannia is an S-type asteroid belonging to the Flora family in the Main Belt. Its rotation period is 4.464 hours.

References

External links
 
 

Flora asteroids
Kressmannia
Kressmannia
S-type asteroids (Tholen)
19150320